Raivo Vare (born 11 May 1958 in Tallinn) is an Estonian politician, entrepreneur, and transit and economic expert.

In 1980 he graduated from Tartu State University with a degree in law.

From 1990 until 1992, he was Minister of State. From 1993 until 1996, he was the head of AS Tallinna Pank. From 1996 until 1999, he was Minister of Roads and Communications.

Awards
 2002: Order of the National Coat of Arms, IV class.
 2006: Order of the National Coat of Arms, II class.

References

Living people
1958 births
Government ministers of Estonia
Recipients of the Order of the National Coat of Arms, 2nd Class
Recipients of the Order of the National Coat of Arms, 4th Class
University of Tartu alumni
Politicians from Tallinn